is an LNG-fired thermal power station operated by JERA in the village of Tobishima, Aichi, Japan. The facility is located on reclaimed land at the head of Mikawa Bay.

History
The Nishi-Nagoya Thermal Power Station began operations as an oil-fired power plant operated by Chubu Electric in 1970. Unit 1 through Unit 6 were constructed between 1970 and 1975.  On September 14, 2010, Chubu Electric announced a renewal plan to replace the aging existing facilities with a high-efficiency natural gas-fired combined cycle power generation system.  

Construction began on Units 7-1 and 7-2 on January 30, 2014. Unit 7-1 came on-line on September 29, 2017, and Unit 7-2 on March 30, 2018. Both Unit 7-1 and 7-2 use a Toshiba exhaust heat recovery multi-shaft 1,600 ℃ class combined cycle power generation system (MACCII) in which three generators are connected to three gas turbines and one steam turbine.  In order to transport the natural gas used at this power plant, a submarine tunnel with a length of 4.6 km extending from the Chita Daini Thermal Power Station  was constructed. In March 2018,  Guinness World Records certified the Nishi-Nagoya Thermal Power Station Unit 7-1 as the world's most efficient combined cycle power generation facility.

In April 2019, the operations of Chubu Electric Power were transferred to JERA, a joint venture between Chubu Electric and TEPCO Fuel & Power, Inc, a subsidiary of Tokyo Electric Power Company.

Plant details

See also 

 Energy in Japan
 List of power stations in Japan

References

External links
official home page

1970 establishments in Japan
Energy infrastructure completed in 1970
Natural gas-fired power stations in Japan
Tobishima, Aichi
Chubu Electric Power